Giaginsky (masculine), Giaginskaya (feminine), or Giaginskoye (neuter) may refer to:
Giaginsky District, a district of the Republic of Adygea, Russia
Giaginskaya, a rural locality (a stanitsa) in the Republic of Adygea, Russia